Bayerotrochus pyramus, common name the pyramus slit shell, is a species of large sea snail, a marine gastropod mollusk in the family Pleurotomariidae, the slit snails.

Description
The shell reaches a length of 64 mm.

Distribution
This marine species occurs in the Lesser Antilles off Guadeloupe, St Lucia and Martinique at depths between 400 m and 560 m.

References

External links
 To Encyclopedia of Life
 To World Register of Marine Species
 

Pleurotomariidae
Gastropods described in 1967